Bonnie Cooper (March 17, 1935 – November 8, 2018) was an All-American Girls Professional Baseball League player. She batted and threw right handed.

Born in Tremont, Illinois, Cooper played at second base for the Battle Creek Belles club during its 1952 season, two years before the league folded. She did not have individual records or some information was incomplete.

Sources

All-American Girls Professional Baseball League players
Battle Creek Belles players
Baseball players from Illinois
People from Tazewell County, Illinois
2018 deaths
1935 births
21st-century American women